Parsons station is a historic railroad depot located at Parsons, Tucker County, West Virginia. It was built by the Western Maryland Railroad in 1888, and is a one-story frame building in the Eastlake movement / Stick Style. It is a simple rectangle measuring 70 feet long and 24 feet wide, with a 12 foot wide, three-sided bay.  It features German siding and a batten seam gable roof.

It was listed on the National Register of Historic Places in 1996 as the Western Maryland Depot.

References

Railway stations in the United States opened in 1888
Railway stations on the National Register of Historic Places in West Virginia
Buildings and structures in Tucker County, West Virginia
Parsons
Stick-Eastlake architecture in West Virginia
National Register of Historic Places in Tucker County, West Virginia
Former railway stations in West Virginia